The South American Women's Volleyball Club Championship is an international women's club volleyball competition organized by the Confederación Sudamericana de Voleibol (CSV), the sport's governing body in South America. The competition was first contested in 2009 in Lima, Peru and tournaments have been held every year since then.

In addition to crowning the South American champions, the tournament also serves as a qualifying tournament for the FIVB Volleyball Women's Club World Championship.

Results

Medals summary

Medal table by club

Medal table by country

MVP by edition
2009 –  Jaqueline Carvalho (Osasco)
2010 –  Adenízia da Silva (Osasco)
2011 –  Jaqueline Carvalho (Osasco)
2012 –  Sheilla Castro (Osasco)
2013 –  Natália Pereira (Rio de Janeiro)
2014 –  Fabiana Claudino (SESI São Paulo)
2015 –  Kenia Carcaces (Osasco)
2016 –  Ana Carolina da Silva (Rio de Janeiro)
2017 –  Gabriela Guimarães (Rio de Janeiro)
2018 –  Caroline Gattaz (Minas Tênis Clube)
2019 –  Caroline Gattaz (Minas Tênis Clube)
2020 –  Thaísa Menezes (Minas Tênis Clube)
2021 –  Cláudia Bueno (Praia Clube)
2022 –  Kisy Nascimento (Minas Tênis Clube)

All-time team records 
Winners and finalists by city since 2009

Various statistics since 2016

(Based on W=2 pts and D=1 pts)

See also

 South American Men's Volleyball Club Championship

References

External links
CSV

 
 
International volleyball competitions
International women's volleyball competitions
Volleyball competitions in South America
Volleyball
Sports club competitions
Annual sporting events
2009 establishments in South America